Mario Genta (1 March 1912 – 9 January 1993) was an Italian footballer who played as a midfielder.

Club career
Born in Turin, Genta played club football in the 1930s for Italian sides Juventus, Prato, and Genoa. He played 223 matches in Serie A and scored 6 goals.

International career
With the Italy national team, Genta was selected to the 1938 FIFA World Cup champion squad as a reserve player. He later earned 2 caps in 1939.

Honours

Club
Juventus
Serie A: 1932–33
Genoa
Coppa Italia: 1936–37
Prato
Serie C: 1948–49

International
Italy
FIFA World Cup: 1938

References

External links
Profile at Enciclopediadelcalcio.it

1912 births
1993 deaths
Footballers from Turin
Juventus F.C. players
Italian footballers
Italy international footballers
Association football midfielders
Serie A players
Serie C players
Genoa C.F.C. players
1938 FIFA World Cup players
FIFA World Cup-winning players
A.C. Prato players